Josip Cavar (born 3 October 1993) is a Swedish handball player for TTH Holstebro and the Swedish national team.

Carrier 
Cavar's mother club is Vetlanda HF. He moved to Gothenburg to go to handball high school there, and then started playing for Redbergslids IK, already as a 16-year-old.

Because he also has origins from Bosnia and Herzegovina, he has played for their U-national teams, including in the U21 WC 2013. He made international debut on the Swedish national team in July 2019, against Japan.

Private life 
He is cohabiting with Swedish national team player Melissa Petrén.

References

1993 births
Living people
Swedish male handball players
TTH Holstebro players
People from Skövde Municipality
Sportspeople from Västra Götaland County